The General Staff of Denmark was a top authority in the Royal Danish Army and was responsible for war preparations (training and education), studies and planning.

Additionally, the Staff also wrote the regulations and historical works. Following the placement under the General Command in 1932, it took over its daily administration. There were two departments within the General Staff, the Command department which stood for the daily administration, and the General Staff department responsible for war preparations.

In times of war, General Staff personnel would join command staffs and serve as advisors during military operations.

History
The idea behind of the General Staff appeared around the ending of the 18th century and the beginning of the 19th century, as there was an increased need for organization within the army. Previously, general staffs were only created in times of war and field commanders were handed staff officers, who lacked proper staff training.
On 20 January 1808, the General Adjutant and General Quartermaster Staff was established
As such, there were two staffs directly below the highest commanding general:
 The General Adjutant Staff, which was responsible for personnel, questions regarding the operations and administrative cases. 
 The General Quartermaster Staff, which stood for providing topographical and statistical information regarding terrain and population, supervision of constructions, education, administrate accommodation and rations.

Initially, staff officers were selected on the basis on who was considered best, without any preparatory education. However, in 1830, following the creation of the Royal Military College, the graduation exam became an admission condition. Education of officers were focused on military history & tactics, and technical and scientific subjects. Slowly, the latter subjects became more prevalent, with topographical work taking up the largest amount, causing internal friction. 

In 1839, following the dismissal of Bülow, the Adjutant Staff was drastically reduced, making the Quartermaster General the chief of the whole staff. As part of the army organization plan of 1842, the Adjutant Staff was finally split from the organization and renamed as "His Majesty the King's Adjutant Staff". Additionally, it was decided that of the 30 members of the General Staff, five would also serve in the Adjutant Staff and the three General Commands.

Shortly before the outbreak of the First Schleswig War, the rations service and equipment administration was subjugated the newly established Ministry of War. 

In 1856, the disproportionally large Topographical Department caused so much in fighting, that it was moved to the Ministry of Finance. However, all communication still had to go through the Chief of the General Staff. This created unnecessary bureaucracy, leading to the removal of the position of the Chief of the General Staff. As a result, there were no chief during the Second Schleswig War, with the rest of the staff having a minor role during the war.

Reestablishment
During the war, it was however made clear there was a high demand for young officers with formal General Staff training, since much of the training at the Royal Military College had been focused on the sciences. As such, work was started to recreate the General Staff. The Topographical Department was moved back into the staff, however there were structural changes which ensured there would not be a too large focus on the department.

The General Staff therefore produced a complete mobilization plan and began regularly holding "General Staff exercises".

Word Wars
During World War I, the General Staff joined with the 1st General Command's staff, to form the Supreme Command Staff as to support the Supreme Command. After the war, cuts to the army resulted in the closure of the General Commands, and the creation of a peacetime supreme command. While the General Staff kept its special status under the Ministry of War, everything that pertained to the preparation for the overall land defense were subjugated the Chief of the General Command.

Following the 1932 Defence Agreement, the General Staff ceased to be an independent institution below the Ministry. The General Staff was instead place as a subordinate to the General Command and served as its staff. This new organization, meant the role of the General Staff was codified in peace and war. 

A few days after the occupation of Denmark, the General Staff began to establish illegal contact with the SOE, as to provide intelligence. After Operation Safari, operations were forced moved to Sweden under the "Small General Staff".

After the war, the General Staff was responsible for the rebuilding of the Army, while ensuring it was modernized. The 1951 Defence Agreement meant major restructuring for the army and the General Staff was renamed the Army Staff.

List of Chiefs

Notes

References
Citations

Bibliography
 
 
 
 
 
 
 
 
 
 
 
 
 
 
 
 
 
 
 
 
 
 
 
 
 
 

Royal Danish Army
Staff (military)